Trash Yéyé  is an album by French pop artist Benjamin Biolay. It was released  on Virgin Records in 2007.

Track listing
"Bien Avant "
"Douloureux Dedans "
"Regarder La Lumière"
"Dans Ta Bouche "
"Dans La Merco Benz"
"La Garçonnière "
"La Chambre D'Amis"
"Qu'est-ce Que Ça Peut Faire "
"Cactus Concerto"
"Rendez-Vous Qui Sait"
"Laisse Aboyer Les Chiens"
"De Beaux Souvenirs"

2007 albums